Talybont (otherwise Tal-y-bont), is a small village to the southeast of the city of Bangor in Gwynedd, north Wales, in the community of Llanllechid, and next to Llandygai. It had a population of 465 as of 2011.

References

Villages in Gwynedd
Llanllechid